Chris Carmichael may refer to:
Chris Carmichael (cyclist) (born 1961), American cycling, triathlon and endurance sports coach, and former Olympic cyclist
Chris Carmichael (musician) (born 1962), American musician and arranger
A fictional person of this name appeared in the early series of The Lucy Show

See also
Christopher Carmichael, wrestler